The Pavilhão da Luz Nº 1, currently known as Pavilhão Fidelidade for sponsorship reasons, is the main arena of Portuguese multi-sport club S.L. Benfica. It has a full capacity of 2,400 seats and is mainly used by the basketball, futsal and roller hockey departments of the club.

Built at the same time as the new Estádio da Luz, it was designed from the start to replace the 37-year old Pavilhão da Luz, which was torn down in March 2003. Opened on 28 February 2004, during the celebrations of the club centenary, its first game opposed the basketball section against Ovarense. Its features include an NBA-style scoreboard, and other standard amenities like safety nets behind the goals, press boxes, five locker rooms, bars, medical offices and accommodation to handicapped fans.

Naming rights
Eight months after its opening, Benfica sold the arena naming rights to Açoreana Seguros for a fee rumoured to be close to €1 million. It is currently named after Fidelidade, a Portuguese insurance company.

References

External links
 
 Pavilhão Fidelidade at zerozero 

S.L. Benfica
Indoor arenas in Portugal
Sports venues in Lisbon
Sports venues completed in 2004
Basketball venues in Portugal